Conversations with My Gardener is a 2007 French film directed by Jean Becker.

Plot 
A painter returns from Paris to his childhood home in rural France. The painter notices that the house's once-impressive vegetable garden has fallen into neglect, and he advertises for a gardener to put it back into shape. The gardener who responds is a former schoolmate. The painter discovers the bucolic side of life and its beauty. Over the next several months, the two different men become friends through long conversations. Through the eyes of each other, they experience the world in a new light. The gardener's occasional stomach cramps is identified as cancer and soon he passes away. The painter takes the insights his friend has given him and shares them through an art exhibition.

Cast 
 Daniel Auteuil - The painter "Dupinceau"
 Jean-Pierre Darroussin : The gardener "Dujardin"
 Fanny Cottençon : Hélène, the wife of "Dupinceau"
 Élodie Navarre : Carole, the daughter of "Dupinceau"
 Alexia Barlier : Magda
 Hiam Abbass : The wife of "Dujardin"
 Nicolas Vaude : Jean-Etienne
 Roger Van Hool : Tony

Accolades

References

External links

2007 films
2000s French-language films
2007 drama films
Films directed by Jean Becker
Films based on French novels
French drama films
2000s French films